Sennius lebasi is a species of pea or bean weevil in the family Chrysomelidae. It is found in the Caribbean, Central America, North America, and South America.

References

Further reading

 
 
 
 
 
 

Bruchinae
Articles created by Qbugbot
Beetles described in 1839